The president of the Chamber of Senators of Bolivia is the presiding officer of the upper chamber of the Plurinational Legislative Assembly. The president is currently elected for a one-year term.

Below is a list of office-holders.:

Presidents 1831 to 1868

Presidents after 1878

See also
 President of the Chamber of Deputies of Bolivia

References

Senate, President of the
Bolivia
1831 establishments in Bolivia